Joachim Octave Fernández, Sr. (August 14, 1896 – August 8, 1978), was a member of the U. S. House of Representatives for Louisiana's 1st congressional district. Like all other members of his state's congressional delegation at the time of his tenure, Fernández was a Democrat.

Biography 
Son of Octave Gonzales Fernández and Mary Benson, he was born, lived, and died in New Orleans, Louisiana. Their ancestors came from the Canary Islands, Spain and were also of Cajun, Alsatian, and Galician descent. Settlers in Louisiana from the Canaries are known as Isleños. On June 3, 1920, he married Viola Murray, and the couple had two sons and two daughters. He began his political career as a member of the Old Regular political machine. He was a member of the Louisiana House of Representatives from 1924 to 1928 and the State Senate from 1928 to 1930 at the time of the administration of Mayor T. Semmes Walmsley. In 1930, however, Fernández defected to the camp of Walmsley's enemy, Governor Huey Pierce Long, Jr.  He became Long's Ninth Ward political boss and was elected to the House of Representatives in 1930 with Long's support.  He lost his seat in 1940 to reform candidate Felix Edward Hébert, a former journalist for the New Orleans Times-Picayune.

Fernández was a delegate to the Louisiana state constitutional convention in 1921, which wrote the document to govern his state until 1975. He was an alternate delegate to the 1936 Democratic National Convention, which renominated the Franklin D. Roosevelt-John Nance Garner ticket. In his forties, Fernández served in the United States Navy as a lieutenant commander during World War II. After his congressional service, Fernández was the U.S. collector of internal revenue in New Orleans.

In the election of 1946, Fernández briefly served as the reform candidate against Mayor Robert Maestri, but he withdrew from the race at the last minute after Maestri offered to pay his campaign expenses. Maestri was unseated, however, by the reformers' choice, deLesseps Story Morrison.

Personal life 
Fernández was Roman Catholic and Hispanic. He was a member of the American Legion. He is interred at the large Metairie Cemetery in New Orleans.

Fernández was known as "Bathtub Joe" Fernández for his habit of avoiding calls from reporters by claiming he was taking a bath.

Children:

Florau Joachim Fernandez married Elizabeth (Betty) Abigail Richard > children 
 Jo Ann Fernandez Ponville married Minos James Ponville, Jr.
 Richard Murray Fernandez married Sherry Law
 Russell Joachim Fernandez married Darla Lucille Thomas
 Randall Robert Fernandez married Sarah (Sally) Evans
 Janet (Jan) Elizabeth Fernandez married Darrio (Dod) Berrio

Mercedes Fernandez married Milton Bradley

Junerose Fernandez married Chester (Chick) Keating > 7 children

'Joachim (Joe) Octave Fernandez, Jr. married Grace Bergeron in 1949 > 4 children  | Married Beverly Wenger in 1970 > 5 children

 Allen Raymond Fernandez
 Carol Ann Fernandez married Tom Joel Montgomery
 David Andrew Fernandez married Mitzi Barbay
 Judy Lynn Fernandez married Werlin (Anthony) Pomfrey Jr.
 Daryl Andrew Fernandez

 See also 
 List of Hispanic and Latino Americans in the United States Congress

 References 

 1 Political Graveyard
 Haas, Edward F. DeLesseps S. Morrison and the Image of Reform: New Orleans Politics, 1946-1961.'' Louisiana State University Press, 1974.

1896 births
1978 deaths
Louisiana Isleño people
American people of Spanish descent
United States Navy officers
United States Navy personnel of World War II
Politicians from New Orleans
Hispanic and Latino American members of the United States Congress
Burials at Metairie Cemetery
Democratic Party members of the United States House of Representatives from Louisiana
20th-century American politicians
Catholics from Louisiana